The Louisiana Tech Bulldogs football statistical leaders are individual statistical leaders of the Louisiana Tech Bulldogs football program in various categories, including passing, rushing, receiving, total offense, defensive stats, and kicking. Within those areas, the lists identify single-game, single-season, and career leaders. The Bulldogs represent Louisiana Tech University in the NCAA's Conference USA (C-USA).

Although Louisiana Tech began competing in intercollegiate football in 1901, the school's official record book does not generally include records from before the 1950s, as records from before this period are often incomplete and inconsistent.

These lists are dominated by more recent players for several reasons:
 Since the 1950s, seasons have increased from 10 games to 11 and then 12 games in length.
 The NCAA didn't allow freshmen to play varsity football until 1972 (with the exception of the World War II years), allowing players to have four-year careers.
 Bowl games only began counting toward single-season and career statistics in 2002. The Bulldogs have played in six bowl games since this decision, giving many recent players an extra game to accumulate statistics.
 The Bulldogs have also played in the C-USA Championship Game twice since joining the league in 2013 (specifically in 2014 and 2016), giving players in those seasons another extra game in which to accumulate statistics.

These lists are updated through the end of the 2018 season.

Passing

Passing yards

Passing touchdowns

Rushing

Rushing yards

Rushing touchdowns

Receiving

Receptions

Receiving yards

Receiving touchdowns

Total offense
Total offense is the sum of passing and rushing statistics. It does not include receiving or returns.

Total offense yards

Total touchdowns
Louisiana Tech's 2018 media guide lists this category as "touchdowns responsible for", and includes only quarterbacks. This list, in keeping with all other Wikipedia lists of college football statistical leaders by team, also includes non-quarterbacks. This statistic includes only passing and rushing touchdowns—not receiving or return touchdowns.

Defense

Interceptions

Tackles

Sacks

Kicking

Field goals made

Field goal percentage
While past Louisiana Tech media guides (as recently as 2015) have included this statistic, the 2018 media guide does not provide any list of leaders in kicking accuracy for either field goals or extra points.

References

Louisiana Tech